Senator Fielding may refer to:

Herbert Fielding (1923–2015), South Carolina State Senate
Jerry L. Fielding (born 1947), Alabama State Senate
Steve Fielding (born 1960), Victoria State Senate, Australia